Edward Lawrence Jefferson (November 27, 1922 – February 26, 1987) was an American Negro league pitcher in the 1940s.

A native of Selma, Alabama, Jefferson played for the Philadelphia Stars in 1945 and 1946. In 14 recorded appearances on the mound, he posted a 2–1 record with a 5.53 ERA in 53.2 innings. Jefferson died in Oxon Hill, Maryland in 1987 at age 64.

References

External links
 and Seamheads

1922 births
1987 deaths
Philadelphia Stars players
Baseball pitchers
Baseball players from Alabama
Sportspeople from Selma, Alabama
20th-century African-American sportspeople